Henry Thurstan Holland, 1st Viscount Knutsford,  (3 August 1825 – 29 January 1914), known as Sir Henry Holland, Bt, from 1873 to 1888 and as The Lord Knutsford from 1888 to 1895, was a British Conservative politician, best known for serving as Secretary of State for the Colonies from 1887 to 1892.

Background and education
The son of Sir Henry Holland, 1st Baronet, a prominent physician, Knutsford was educated at Harrow School, Durham University, and Trinity College, Cambridge, and took his degree in 1847. He studied law, and was called to the bar at the Inner Temple in 1849.  He practiced law privately until 1867, when he became legal advisor to the Colonial Office.

Political career

In 1870 Knutsford became assistant colonial undersecretary, serving until 1874, and in 1873, having succeeded his father as 2nd Baronet, he was elected to the House of Commons as a Conservative. In Lord Salisbury's first administration (1885–1886), Knutsford served as Financial Secretary to the Treasury and then as Vice President of the Committee of Council on Education.  He served in this role again at the beginning of Salisbury's second ministry (1886–1887), but was soon promoted to Colonial Secretary (in January 1887).

As Colonial Secretary, Knutsford was largely concerned with South African affairs, being the Colonial Secretary who granted the charter for Cecil Rhodes's British South Africa Company in 1887. In 1888 he was elevated to the peerage as Baron Knutsford, of Knutsford in the County Palatine of Chester. In 1895, Knutsford was not included in Salisbury's new government. He was further honoured the same year when he was made Viscount Knutsford, of Knutsford in the County Palatine of Chester.

St John′s Ambulance
Lord Knutsford was a Director of the Ambulance department of the Order of the Hospital of Saint John in England, and Chairman of the St John Ambulance Association. The association mobilized detachments serving in South Africa during the Second Boer War (1899–1902), with Lord Knutsford raising support for the work. In July 1902 he received an Award for conspicuous service to the order.

Family
Holland married Elizabeth Margaret, daughter of Nathaniel Hibbert, in 1852. They had twin sons and one daughter:
Hon. Edith Emily Holland (1853–1923)
Sydney Holland, 2nd Viscount Knutsford (1855–1931)
Arthur Holland-Hibbert, 3rd Viscount Knutsford (1855–1935)

Elizabeth died in April 1855, only a few weeks after the birth of her twin sons. On 25 November 1858, Holland married Margaret Jean Trevelyan (1835–1906), by whom he had a daughter and three sons:
Henry Macaulay Holland (16 September 1859 – 6 April 1878)
Hon. Margaret Alice Holland (5 September 1861 – 1937), married Reginald Abel Smith
Capt. Hon. Cecil Trevelyan Holland (26 October 1862 – 1941)
Hon. Lionel Raleigh Holland (1865–1936)

Lady Knutsford was also involved with the St John Ambulance Association, and in July 1902 received an Award for conspicuous service for her work as Chairman of the Special Committee formed to despatch medical comforts to the Brigade units during the Second Boer War.

Lord Knutsford remained a widower until his death in January 1914, aged 88. His funeral was held at Golders Green Crematorium. He was succeeded in his titles by his elder twin son, Sydney.

Arms

References

External links 

 

|-

|-

|-

Knutsford, Henry Holland, 1st Viscount
Conservative Party (UK) MPs for English constituencies
UK MPs 1874–1880
UK MPs 1880–1885
UK MPs 1885–1886
UK MPs 1886–1892
UK MPs who were granted peerages
Members of the Privy Council of the United Kingdom
Knutsford, Henry Holland, 1st Viscount
Knutsford, Henry Holland, 1st Viscount
Knutsford, Henry Holland, 1st Viscount
Knutsford, Henry Holland, 1st Viscount
Knutsford, Henry Holland, 1st Viscount
Golders Green Crematorium
Knutsford
Secretaries of State for the Colonies
Alumni of University College, Durham
Peers of the United Kingdom created by Queen Victoria